John Alexander Crawford (born May 31, 1983), professionally known as JonFX, is a music producer from St. Andrews, Jamaica. He has worked with dancehall and reggae artists Shabba Ranks, I Wayne, Vybz Kartel, Gyptian and Akon, as well as late rapper XXXTentacion. In June 2018, he was appointed as a governor on the board of the Florida Grammy Chapter.

In November 2018, Arms Around You, a song produced by JonFX, entered the Billboard Hot 100 at number 28; Streaming Songs Chart at number 18; R&B Streaming Songs Chart at number one; and Digital Sales Chart at number 18. He produced Sizzla Kalonji's I'm Yours, which made to the Billboard Reggae chart and Billboard Heatseeker's chart at No. 3 and No. 4.

Career 
JonFX produced Gyptian's Hold Yuh and an album of the same name in 2010. In 2017, he produced Sizzla's I'm Yours, which entered both the Billboard Reggae chart and Billboard Heatseeker's chart at No. 3 and No. 4. Crawford also mixed XXXTentacion's hit Jocelyn Flores which peaked at number No. 19 on the Billboard Hot 100 and has been certified platinum in the United States.

Some of his credits include, Gun Session featuring Akon, Young Jeezy, Shabba Ranks and Vybz Kartel; Nah Let Go and I Can Feel Your Pain by Gyptian and Baby, a collaboration between Sean Paul, Shabba Ranks and Erup. He also has been credited as writer and engineer on three tracks, Alone, Part 3, Smash and I Don't Even Speak Spanish LOL, from XXXTentacion's platinum-selling album.

He currently serves as a governor on the board of the Florida Grammy Chapter.

Discography
 List of features with other performing artists, showing year released and song title

Peak Chart Positions

1997–present

See also 

 List of Jamaican record producers

References

External links
 
 

1983 births
Living people
Jamaican musicians
Jamaican record producers